Year 1088 (MLXXXVIII) was a leap year starting on Saturday (link will display the full calendar) of the Julian calendar.

Events 
 By place 

 Europe 
 Almoravid forces (supported with fighters from local Andalusian provinces), under Sultan Yusuf ibn Tashfin,  besiege Aledo, but are forced to retreat, by the arrival of Spanish troops of King Alfonso VI (the Brave) of Castile.
 Catalonian troops, under Count Berenguer Ramon  II, reconquer Tarragona (lost again in 1108). He will rule Catalonia with his 6-year-old nephew Ramon Berenguer III, until he comes of age.

 England 
 Spring – A rebellion led by William the Conqueror's half-brothers Odo of Bayeux and Robert (2nd Earl of Cornwall), begins against King William II with the aim to remove him from the throne. Odo's revolt in Kent and Sussex is supported by nobles across the country.
 The Worcestershire rebellion led by Robert de Lacy (a son of Ilbert de Lacy) is dealt with quickly by Wulfstan, bishop of Worcester, who calls on those knights and local landowners still loyal to William II to defend Worcester. Many of the rebels are captured or killed.
 William II calls the representatives of the fyrd to a meeting in London. He promises (with the support of Lanfranc, bishop of Canterbury) the people better laws, and the removal of taxes if they support him against the rebels.
 William II lays siege to Pevensey Castle where Odo of Bayeux has taken shelter with Robert. Odo is forced to surrender, and agrees to go to Rochester to convince the rebels to accept William as the rightful king of England.
 Summer – William II lays siege to Rochester Castle and puts down the revolt. Odo of Bayeux and the rebels surrender (only agreeing that their lives will be spared). William takes Odo's lands and exiles him to Normandy.

 Africa 
 Nasir ibn Alnas, ruler of the Hammadids, dies after a 26-year reign. He is succeeded by his son Al-Mansur ibn al-Nasir (until 1104).

 By topic 

 Arts and Culture 
 The Dream Pool Essays is published by the Chinese polymath scientist and statesman Shen Kuo. His book represents the earliest known writing about the magnetic compass, movable type printing, experimentation with the camera obscura only decades after Hasan ibn al-Haytham, which includes many different fields of study in essay and encyclopedic form, including geology, astronomy, archaeology, mathematics, pharmacology, magnetism, geography, optics, hydraulics, economics, military strategy, philosophy, etc. Some of Shen's most advanced theories include geomorphology and climate variability, while he improves Chinese astronomy, by fixing the position of the pole star and correcting the lunar error, by plotting its orbital course every night for a continuum of five years. Shen's book is also the first to describe the drydock in China – and discusses the advantages of the recent invention of the canal pound lock, over the old flash lock.
 Su Song, Chinese polymath scientist and statesman, invents the pilot model for his astronomical clock tower constructed in Kaifeng. It features an escapement mechanism –  and the world's oldest known power-transmitting chain drive to operate the armillary sphere, opening doors, and mechanical-driven mannequins, that would rotate in shifts to announce the time on plaques.

 Education 
 The oldest extant university, the University of Bologna, is founded in Italy (approximate date).

 Geology 
 April 16 – The 6.5  Tmogvi earthquake affects the southern provinces of Georgia, which causes the destruction of the castle of Tmogvi and many deaths.

 Religion 
 March 12 – Pope Urban II (or Urbanus) succeeds Victor III as the 159th pope of the Catholic Church in Rome.

Births 
 January 31 – Ja'far ibn Abdallah al-Muqtadi, was the son of caliph al-Muqtadi and Mah-i Mulk.
 July 24 – Ibn al-Arif, Moorish Sufi scholar and writer (d. 1141)
 Bermudo Pérez de Traba, Spanish nobleman (d. 1168)
 Hemachandra, Indian Jain poet and polymath (d. 1173)
 Irene of Hungary, Byzantine empress consort (d. 1134)
 John IV, Byzantine prince and archbishop (approximate date)
 Lucienne de Rochefort, French crown princess (d. 1137)
 Tairrdelbach Ua Conchobair, king of Connacht (d. 1156)
 William III (or William IV), French nobleman (d. 1156)
 Zhenxie Qingliao, Chinese Zen Buddhist monk (d. 1151)

Deaths 
 January 6 – Berengar of Tours, French theologian
 April 7 – Burchard II (or Bucco), German bishop
 June 15 – Gebhard of Salzburg, German archbishop
 June 24 – William de Warenne, Norman nobleman
 July 27 – Benno II, German bishop and architect
 September 25 – Godfrey, bishop of Chichester
 September 28 – Hermann of Salm, German nobleman
 Alberic of Monte Cassino, German Benedictine cardinal
 Berthold of Reichenau, German chronicler and writer
 Dubh Chablaigh ingen Áed, Irish queen of Munster
 Hugh de Montfort, Norman nobleman (approximate date)
 John Doukas, Byzantine usurper (approximate date)
 Khwaja Abdullah Ansari, Persian Sufi poet (b. 1006)
 Mael Isa ua Máilgiric, Irish Chief Ollam and writer
 Marianus Scotus of Regensburg, Irish abbot
 Naser Khosrow, Persian poet and philosopher (b. 1004)
 Nasir ibn Alnas, Berber ruler of the Hammadids
 Ranulf I (or Rainulf), Italo-Norman nobleman
 Rhiryd ap Bleddyn, Welsh king of Powys (b. 1049) 
 Tigernach Ua Braín, Irish abbot and writer

References